Comeback season may refer to:

Comeback Season (film), a 2006 American film
Comeback Season (mixtape), a 2007 Drake mixtape